Anasuyabai Kale was an Indian politician. She was elected  to the Lok Sabha, the lower house of the Parliament of India, from Nagpur as a member of the Indian National Congress in 1952. She was re-elected as a member of the 2nd Lok Sabha in 1957.

Prior to her election to the Lok Sabha, Kale had been a member of the Assembly of the Central Provinces and Berar, to which she was nominated in 1928. She also served in 1937 as Deputy Speaker of the Central Provinces Legislative Assembly. In 1948, she was president of the All India Women's Conference.

She was a descendant of The Diwan of Aundh state. She married into the cadet branch of Kale of Waghere, Nashik. She was educated at Hujur Paga High School and Fergusson College in Poona and then at Baroda College, Baroda. She was married to Purushottam Balakrishna Kale. She had three sons and two daughters. After winning Lok Sabha election from Nagpur in 1957, she died mid-term two years later.

References

External Links
Official biographical sketch in Parliament of India website

India MPs 1952–1957
India MPs 1957–1962
Indian National Congress politicians from Maharashtra
Fergusson College alumni
Maharaja Sayajirao University of Baroda alumni
Women in Maharashtra politics
Women members of the Lok Sabha
20th-century Indian women politicians
20th-century Indian politicians
Lok Sabha members from Maharashtra
Politicians from Nagpur
Year of birth missing
1959 deaths